MJ Delaney is a British director. She is known for her work on Ted Lasso, for which she won a Primetime Emmy Award in 2022.

Career 
Delaney was born in London and graduated from Oxford University in 2007. She found early success in 2010 by making a parody of the music video for "Empire State of Mind", with the song rewritten to praise the Welsh town of Newport. The video's viral popularity led to her work directing well-received ads for organizations such as Aldi and Plan International. She also directed an episode of Coming Up. Her feature-film debut, Powder Room, was released in 2013.

Delaney worked with Sharon Horgan and Morgana Robinson on the short programme Morgana Robinson's Summer, which won a BAFTA Award in 2018. She later directed the final two episodes of the first season of Ted Lasso, receiving an Emmy nomination for "The Hope That Kills You". Delaney returned for Ted Lassos second season and won an Emmy for directing the episode "No Weddings and a Funeral".

Awards and nominations

References

External links 
 

British television directors
Living people
Year of birth missing (living people)